Tara Kemp is an American singer best known for her two Billboard Hot 100 top-ten singles in 1991: "Hold You Tight" and "Piece of My Heart."

Career
Kemp signed to Giant Records in 1990, a new sublabel of the Warner Brothers music label. In January 1991, her self-titled album and debut single "Hold You Tight" were released. "Hold You Tight" became a hit, peaking at number three on the Billboard Hot 100 chart; the song was certified gold by the RIAA and ranked as the twenty-fifth best-selling single of 1991. The song also peaked at No. 69 in the UK Singles Chart. In May, Kemp released her second single "Piece of My Heart", which reached number seven on the Hot 100 in July and was the eighty-fourth best-selling single of the year. A third single "Too Much" was released, but stalled at number 95. 

Following the release of her debut album, Giant began to interfere with Kemp's recording of her sophomore album. Wanting to sign to Atlantic Records – where most of the people who had signed her to Giant had moved to – Kemp asked to be released from her contract. However, Atlantic did not sign her. Kemp released two more songs: in 1993, "Action Speaks Louder Than Words" was featured on the soundtrack for the Fox television series, Beverly Hills, 90210; and "Come Correct", which was released independently in 1994. Owing to issues in her personal life, she left the music industry soon after.

In 2013, Kemp launched a Facebook page and YouTube channel containing new photography, uploads of vintage material, and teasers to a new track called "Water." In 2014 and 2015, Kemp revealed in interviews that she was working on new material. In April 2016, Kemp released "Paris in Spring" (featuring D'wayne Wiggins), her first single in 22 years, as a charity single to benefit victims of the November 2015 Paris attacks.

In January 2021, Kemp revealed plans to independently release her shelved sophomore album and remastered versions of her 1991 singles. She is working with New York City-based Shakir Entertainment.

Discography

Studio albums

Singles

References

External links 
 [ Tara Kemp] at Allmusic
 

Year of birth missing (living people)
Living people
20th-century American singers
20th-century American women singers
21st-century American singers
21st-century American women singers
American dance musicians
American women pop singers
American contemporary R&B singers
Giant Records (Warner) artists
Musicians from the San Francisco Bay Area
People from Livermore, California
Dance-pop musicians
New jack swing musicians